Paradise Air was an air charter operator located in Costa Rica also flying to Panama, Nicaragua and throughout Central America and the Caribbean.  The airline was based at the Tobías Bolaños International Airport, San José, Costa Rica and was the only FAA Part 129 approved charter operator in the region.  The company, started in 2000, was owned and operated by a former corporate pilot, Art Dawley, who flew business jets for DreamWorks Movie Studios for many years.  The charter company specialized in flying from San Jose to the various tourist based destinations throughout the region.

Effective May 16, 2013, Paradise Air has ceased air charter operations in Costa Rica.

Former destinations

La Fortuna
Barra de Colorado
Barra de Tortuguero
Playa Carrillo
Drake Bay
Golfito
Jacó
Liberia
Limón
Nicoya
Nosara
Palma Sur
Puerto Jiménez
Punta Islita Airport
Quepos
San Isidro
Tamarindo
Tambor

In Central America and Caribbean:

Panama City, Panama
Managua, Nicaragua
Roatan, Honduras
Belize City, Belize
San Salvador, El Salvador
Santo Domingo, Dominican Republic
Grand Cayman Islands
Havana, Cuba

Former fleet
Gippsland GA8 Airvan
Cessna 208 Grand Caravan

External links

Paradise Air
Air Charter Guide

2000 establishments in Costa Rica
2013 disestablishments in Costa Rica
Airlines established in 2000
Airlines disestablished in 2013
Defunct airlines of Costa Rica